Several ships of the Swedish Navy have been named HSwMS Spica, named after the Spica star:

  was a  launched in 1908 and decommissioned in 1947
  was a  launched in 1966 and decommissioned in 1989

Swedish Navy ship names